Justin David Pollard (born 30 January 1968) is a British historian, television producer, writer and entrepreneur. He is best known for his work on such films as Elizabeth and Pirates of the Caribbean and TV series including Vikings and The Tudors. He is also a co-founder (with John Mitchinson and Dan Kieran) of the publishing company Unbound.

Biography
Pollard is a popular historian, historical consultant and screenwriter working in the field of feature films, television and print. He was born in Hertfordshire and was educated at St Albans School and Downing College, Cambridge, where he graduated with honours in archaeology and anthropology.

After college he worked for a year as an archaeologist at the Museum of London on the excavation of Thomas Becket’s old monastery of Merton Priory. During that time he also developed an educational programme for schools visiting the Surrey Heath Archaeological and Heritage Trust in Surrey for which the Trust was awarded the Graham Webster Laurels at the British Archaeology Awards for their contribution to education in archaeology.

Leaving the Museum of London in 1990, Pollard moved into documentary production initially as a researcher, and then a writer and producer. His television credits include development and scripting for the BBC's QI, Channel 4's Time Team, including writing the Christmas special Time Team's History of Britain, script editing Bob Geldof's Geldof in Africa, and developing Terry Jones' Barbarians. He has also written the 3x1 hour history of the Egyptian New Kingdom for the BBC and Lion Television, Egypt’s Golden Empire, which was nominated for an Emmy Award. As well as these he has written and produced documentaries on everything from cannibalism amongst the Dongria Kondh in India to the career of Vlad the Impaler, for presenters including Terry Jones, Bettany Hughes, Alexei Sayle, Tony Robinson and Bob Geldof, and broadcasters including BBC, ITV, Channel 4, National Geographic Channel, PBS, A&E, Discovery Channel, Canal+, ZDF, S4C, ITN and others.

Apart from producing documentaries, Pollard runs a company that provides historical and script consultancy for historical feature films and television dramas. He has a long association with Indian director Shekhar Kapur and was historical consultant on his features Elizabeth, The Four Feathers, and Elizabeth: The Golden Age coaching cast (including Cate Blanchett, Joseph Fiennes, Geoffrey Rush, Richard Attenborough, Fanny Ardant, Vincent Cassel, John Gielgud and Heath Ledger) and crew in the historical background to the stories. He has also worked closely in developing other history-based features for directors, including Gillies MacKinnon, Sam Mendes, Jan de Bont and Neil Jordan. He was the historical consultant on Joe Wright's film, Atonement and has recently worked on two movies with Johnny Depp - Alice in Wonderland (2010 film) directed by Tim Burton, Pirates of the Caribbean: On Stranger Tides directed by Rob Marshall and Les Misérables directed by Tom Hooper.

In television he is the historical consultant for the MGM Television/History Channel drama Vikings and has recently worked on all four series of the Showtime hit The Tudors starring Jonathan Rhys Meyers and Camelot (TV series) starring Joseph Fiennes for Starz (TV network).

Pollard is a regular columnist for History Today, Engineering & Technology and BBC History Magazine and a contributor to the QI books and Annuals including The Book of General Ignorance. His latest book World of the Vikings was released in November 2015.

Pollard is also one of the founders of the crowdsourcing publisher Unbound and is a Fellow of the Royal Historical Society and the Royal Geographical Society

Feature films
 The Pope's Exorcist (2022 film) starring Russell Crowe
 Mulan (2020 film) directed by Niki Caro
 Mary Poppins Returns directed by Rob Marshall
 Dracula Untold starring Luke Evans (actor)
 A Little Chaos directed by Alan Rickman
 Les Misérables (2012 film) directed by Tom Hooper
 Mary Queen of Scots (2013 film) directed by Thomas Imbach
 Pirates of the Caribbean: On Stranger Tides directed by Rob Marshall starring Johnny Depp
 Alice in Wonderland (2010 film) directed by Tim Burton starring Johnny Depp
 Red Tails produced by George Lucas
 Agora directed by Alejandro Amenábar (2009)
 The Boy in the Striped Pyjamas directed by Mark Herman
 Atonement directed by Joe Wright starring Keira Knightley
 Elizabeth: The Golden Age directed by Shekhar Kapur
 The Four Feathers directed by Shekhar Kapur
 Elizabeth directed by Shekhar Kapur starring Cate Blanchett

Television series
 History: The Interesting Bits. Animated history TV series for National Geographic (American TV channel) and Curiosity Stream
 Vikings: Valhalla Drama spin-off from Vikings (2013 TV series)
 Watchmen (TV series) American superhero drama television series for HBO/ Paramount Television Studios
 Vikings (2013 TV series). Drama series starring Travis Fimmel for MGM Television/ History Channel
 Peaky Blinders (TV series)Created by Steven Knight
 QI (Series 3 onwards). 16-part comedy panel show hosted by Stephen Fry for BBC1
 Will (TV series)produced by Shekhar Kapur
 Britannia (TV series) written by Jez Butterworth.
 Camelot (TV series) (Series 1 to 4). Drama series starring Joseph Fiennes for Starz (TV network)
 The Tudors (Series 1 to 4). Drama series starring Jonathan Rhys Meyers for Showtime
 Alexandria: The Greatest City for Channel 4
 The Gunpowder Plot: Exploding The Legend for ITV4
 Geldof in Africa for BBC1
 Terry Jones' Barbarians.  Series for BBC
 Seven Ages of Britain. 7 hour series for Channel 4 presented by Bettany Hughes
 Ancient Discoveries. 3x1 hr history series for S4C/ A&E
 $100 Ride. 13-part travel series narrated by Alexei Sayle for National Geographic.
 Egypt's Golden Empire. 3 hr documentary series for BBC/PBS/DDE.
 Time Team History of Britain for Channel 4
 Time Team Live from York for Channel 4
 Time Team series VII for Channel 4
 Time Team Live for Channel 4
 Royal Secrets for TLC

Bibliography

 
 Alfred the Great: The Man Who Made England (Hardcover), 2005. 
 The Rise and Fall of Alexandria: Birthplace of the Modern World (Hardcover), with Howard Reid 2006. 
 The Interesting Bits: The History You Might Have Missed (Hardcover), 2007. 
 The Story of Archaeology (Hardcover), 2007. 
 Charge! The Interesting Bits of Military History (Hardcover), 2008. 
 Secret Britain - The Hidden Bits of Our History, October 2009. 
 Wonders of the Ancient World (Hardcover), 2009. 
 Boffinology - The Real Stories Behind Our Greatest Scientific Discoveries, October 2010. 
 Buses, Bankers & the Beer of Revenge: An Eccentric Engineer Collection, November 2012. 
 World of the Vikings, November 2015.

References

External links
 Boffinology Author website
 Secret Britain Author website
 Official website
 
 The Golden Age production blog on Shekhar Kapur's website
 The Golden Age production diary on Working Title's website
 Books in print
 QI website

1968 births
Living people
Alumni of Downing College, Cambridge
Time Team
British documentary film producers
British documentary filmmakers
British historians
British writers
History Today people
People educated at St Albans School, Hertfordshire